Joseph Wayne Matheny (born December 24, 1961, in Chicago, Illinois) is an American writer and transmedia artist who has created works using alternate reality gaming and transmedia storytelling methods. He holds patents for prediction, recommendation and behavioral analysis algorithms and software design. He is a published author of screenplays, white papers, technology, sci-fi, marketing and gaming books. He currently resides in Los Angeles, CA. He is probably best known for the avant-garde work Ong's Hat, which has been called the proto-Alternate Reality Game. Ong's Hat is often cited as the first ARG on many lists of alternate reality games.

Books 
 Statio Numero: Part 3 of the Liminal Cycle, Wildcard Interactive, 2022. 
 Xen: The Zen of the Other (as Ezra Buckley), Wildcard Interactive, 2020. 
 Liminal (as Cameron Whiteside), Wildcard Interactive, 2017. 
 Ong's Hat the Beginning, Wildcard Interactive, 2002. 
 Game over?, Immersion New Media, 2002. 
 Why DVD? A Meat and Potatoes Guide for the Uninitiated, Metalepsis, 1999. 
 The Incunabula Papers: Ong's Hat and Other Gateways to New Dimensions, eXe, 1999.

Contributions to other books and publications

"Conversations with Diane Di Prima": Contributor
"The Big Black Book: Become Who You Are": Contributor
"Beats In Time: A Literary Generation's Legacy": Contributor
Rebels and Devils: The Psychology of Liberation: Contributor
Black Book Omega: Cirque Apoklypsis: Contributor
YouTube: An Insider’s Guide to Climbing the Charts: Contributor
Black Book Volume 3, Part I: The Black Symphony, First Movement: Contributor
Black Book Volume 3, Part II: The Black Symphony, Second Movement: Contributor
What Would Bill Hicks Say: Forward- Contributor
Exquisite Language: Contributor
Poker Without Cards: Contributor-Forward, Afterward and Editor
This Is Not A Game: A Guide to Alternate Reality Gaming: Contributor and Editor
Covert Culture Sourcebook: Contributor
The Millennium Whole Earth Catalog: Contributor

Filmography

Feature films and documentaries
 My Neighbors Daughter (1998): Art Director, Actor
 Amerikanskaya doch (1995): Art Director, Actor
Mary Jane's Not a Virgin Anymore (1997): Actor
The "I" in the Triangle with Robert Anton Wilson (2010): Director
TAZ: The Temporary Autonomous Zone (2010): Producer, Performer
Inside A Mind (2021): Appears as self

Discography
 The Incident at Ong's Hat- audio drama (2023) BBC
 Xen: The Zen of the Other- audio drama (2021) Wildcard
 Robert Anton Wilson Remembered (2011) Hukilau
 Robert Anton Wilson: The Lost Studio Sessions (2010) Original Falcon
 TAZ- The Temporary Autonomous Zone (2010) Original Falcon
 The Banishing Ritual with Illusion of Safety (1991)

References

External links 

 
 

1961 births
Living people
Writers from Chicago
American science fiction writers
American film directors
American male novelists